Growing American Youth is a social support organization for youth who live in or near St. Louis, Missouri, and who are 21 and under and identify as lesbian, gay, bisexual, transgender, asexual, or who are questioning their sexual orientation or gender identity. Growing American Youth has been serving St. Louis area youth since 1979.

The group meets Thursdays at 7 pm at Trinity Church, located at 600 N. Euclid Ave., and Tuesdays at 7 pm at the Youth in Need building in St.Charles, Missouri, located at 1815 Boone's Lick Rd. With adult supervision, attendees discuss various situations in their lives, topics in the news and government, self-acceptance, coming out, and getting along with peers. Not all of the conversations deal with LGBT issues; youth may ask for advice or bring up anything on their minds, or the advisors can suggest a topic for discussion. Straight allies are welcome to attend meetings and participate in discussions.

Among other events, such as their New Year's Eve lock-ins and their annual GSA (Gay-Straight Alliance) Summit, the group organizes a yearly prom for youth who may not be able to go to or would rather not attend their regular high school prom due to problems with whom they want to bring or what they want to wear, or if they are having problems with fellow students at school . They are represented yearly at St. Louis PrideFest, with over 500 LGBT and allied young people marching in the 2012 parade.

History
In late 1979, St. Louis Metropolitan Community Church (MCC) member Al Macabeo saw that LGBT youth in the city lacked a source of legitimate information and activities. He sought and gained permission from the church’s Board of Directors to start a social support group.

The group first met at the MCC church on Waterman Ave. in the city's Central West End. Initially meetings were small and the group had no official name. In 1980, the simple name “Pride” was adopted.

In that same year, Bill Cordes took on the role of sponsor. In addition to facilitating discussion among the young people, Bill offered advice about interacting with the (often hostile) police, about staying safe in the city and in the early days of AIDS, he made accurate information available. He often said, "One way a majority group oppresses a minority is to take away its history." He made it a point of starting meetings with a short "gay history" lesson: either by reading a profile of a famous gay or lesbian person or recounting stories of the "gay liberation movement" such as the Stonewall Riots. Bill was instrumental in Growing American Youth's success for over two decades until his death in 2005 at the age of 60.

Soon after the youth group's start, some older people began hanging around MCC during meetings and the sheltering church became uncomfortable with this. Organizers promptly clarified the intent of the group, changing the name to the "Under 21 Group". The name was soon changed again, this time to the present "Growing American Youth."

In 1984, the MCC of Greater St. Louis moved to a church at 1120 Dolman Ave. which they had purchased. The youth group followed, meeting in the church's basement until the church sold the property in the 1990s.

References

LGBT youth organizations based in the United States
Youth organizations based in Missouri
Organizations based in St. Louis
LGBT culture in Missouri